Mort Aux Vaches is a full-length session recording from ambient music artist Colleen, released in 2006 as part of the Mort Aux Vaches music series. Keeping with the style of the series the album is packaged in a hardback case wrapped in textured wallpaper and fastened with a safety pin. It was limited to 500 copies.

Track listing
 "A Little Mechanical Waltz" – 2:35
 "The Zither Song" – 5:13
 "The Bowing Song" – 3:44
 "The Melodica Song" – 8:02
 "The Thumb Piano Song" – 5:33
 "The Ukulele Song" – 3:39
 "The Cello Song" – 3:34
 "Petite Fleur" – 6:23

External links
 Information
 
 

Colleen (musician) albums
2006 albums